James Harold Umbarger (born February 17, 1953) is an American former professional baseball pitcher. He attended Grant High School in Van Nuys, California, and was the 33rd pick in the 1971 Major League Baseball draft by the Cleveland Indians, but opted to attend Arizona State University.  In 1974, The Sporting News named Umbarger as honorable mention on the All-America team. He was later selected in the 16th round of the 1974 Major League Baseball draft by the Texas Rangers.

Umbarger made his major league debut in April, of 1975, with the Rangers, and had a successful rookie season for the team, going 8-7 in 56 games (12 of them starts, with 2 shutouts), with a 4.12 ERA. The following season, Umberger started 30 games for the Rangers, going 10-12 (with 3 shutouts) with a 3.15 ERA.

Prior to the 1977 season, Umbarger was traded to the Oakland Athletics, along with Rodney Scott, for outfielder Claudell Washington.  Umbarger was sold back to the Rangers  August 24, 1977.  Umbarger finished the 1977 season with the Rangers and returned for the 1978 campaign, appearing in 32 games and posting a 4.88 ERA.  The 1978 season would be Umbarger's last in the major leagues.

References

Sources
, or Retrosheet
Pura Pelota (Venezuelan Winter League)

1953 births
Living people
Arizona State Sun Devils baseball players
Baseball players from California
Charleston Charlies players
Denver Bears players
Glens Falls White Sox players
Hawaii Islanders players
Major League Baseball pitchers
Navegantes del Magallanes players
Oakland Athletics players
Pittsfield Rangers players
Rochester Red Wings players
San Jose Missions players
Sportspeople from Burbank, California
Texas Rangers players
Tucson Toros players
Tulsa Drillers players
Grant High School (Los Angeles) alumni
American expatriate baseball players in Venezuela
Alaska Goldpanners of Fairbanks players